The Turkish Democratic Party (Demokratska partija na Turcite) is a political party of the Turkish minority in North Macedonia. 
In the 2002 parliamentary elections, the party joined the SDSM-led coalition and won 2 seats. In the 2006 parliamentary elections, it joined the SDSM-led coalition and won 2 parliamentary seats.
The Party was a part of the VMRO-DPMNE coalition for 8 years from 2008 to 2016. The Party has one member, Yusuf Hasani, in the Macedonian parliament. The party did participate in a coalition with SDSM-Besa in the 2020 parliamentary elections.

See also
Turks of North Macedonia
North Macedonia–Turkey relations

References

External links
Official website

Political parties of minorities in North Macedonia
Political parties of minorities
Turkish political parties
Turkish diaspora in Europe
Turks in North Macedonia